Barbara Babcock is an American actress who played Grace Gardner on Hill Street Blues, for which she won an Emmy Award for Outstanding Lead Actress—Drama Series in 1981, She played Dorothy Jennings on Dr. Quinn, Medicine Woman, for which she was nominated for an Emmy Award in 1995.

Early life
Although she was born in the United States, Babcock spent a large part of her childhood in Tokyo, Japan, where her father, U.S. Army Gen. Conrad Stanton Babcock, Jr., was stationed. She learned to speak Japanese before English.

Babcock studied at Switzerland's University of Lausanne and Italy's University of Milan. She also attended Miss Porter's School and graduated from Wellesley College, where she was a classmate of Ali MacGraw's.

Career
Babcock's television appearances, beginning in 1956, include several episodes of the original series of Star Trek, although much of her work on the show consisted of uncredited voice roles. 

In 1968, she made her debut on the big screen in the Metro-Goldwyn-Mayer Western Day of the Evil Gun with Glenn Ford, followed by roles in the films Heaven with a Gun also with Glenn Ford, Bang the Drum Slowly with Robert De Niro, Chosen Survivors, The Black Marble, Back Roads with Sally Field and Tommy Lee Jones, The Lords of Discipline, and That Was Then... This Is Now with Emilio Estevez. From 1978 to 1982, she played the role of Liz Craig on the CBS soap opera Dallas. Her other notable films include Heart of Dixie with Ally Sheedy, Happy Together, Far and Away with Tom Cruise and Nicole Kidman, and Space Cowboys with Clint Eastwood and James Garner. She also appeared in an episode of Hogan's Heroes in 1969.

Babcock won the 1981 Primetime Emmy Award for Outstanding Lead Actress—Drama Series for her work on Hill Street Blues. She appeared in 16 episodes of the NBC police drama as Grace Gardner from 1981 to 1986. She starred in the short-lived TV series The Four Seasons in 1984, Mr. Sunshine in 1986, and The Law & Harry McGraw in 1987.

From 1993 to 1998, she played the role of Dorothy Jennings on Dr. Quinn, Medicine Woman, for which she was nominated for an Emmy Award for Outstanding Supporting Actress in a Drama Series in 1993. (However, the Emmy Awards website lists the nomination for 1995.) She was voted one of the 50 Most Beautiful People in the World by People in 1994. After completion of the show in 1998, she appeared in The Pretender, Chicago Hope, Frasier, and Judging Amy. From 2001 to 2002, she played the role of the mother of Dana Delany's character in the Fox drama series Pasadena.

Personal life
In 2004, Babcock was diagnosed with Parkinson's disease and now resides in Carmel, California.

Babcock and actress Susan Bjurman received a patent for a shampoo that they developed.

Filmography

Film

Television

References

External links

Living people
20th-century American actresses
21st-century American actresses
Actresses from California
Actresses from Kansas
American film actresses
American stage actresses
American television actresses
Miss Porter's School alumni
Outstanding Performance by a Lead Actress in a Drama Series Primetime Emmy Award winners
People from Carmel-by-the-Sea, California
People with Parkinson's disease
Year of birth missing (living people)